Michèle Girardon (9 August 1938 – 25 March 1975), sometimes credited as Michele Girardon, was a French actress.

Career
Born in Lyon, France, Girardon began acting as early as 1956, and had a small but noticeable role as a deaf-mute beauty in director Luis Buñuel's La mort en ce jardin (Death in the Garden) (1956). She soon became prominent in a host of films, including those of notable directors of the French New Wave.  She is probably best known as an actress for her work in director Louis Malle's Les Amants (The Lovers) in 1958, and the 1961 Howard Hawks production of Hatari! starring John Wayne and Hardy Krüger; for the latter, as she spoke no English when cast in the role, she taught herself English while on the set, according to a July 1961 Life magazine profile of the actress.
The same article stated she was signed to a five–year contract with Paramount Studios. 1963 proved to be her most active year, with several avant garde films to her credit including Pierre Kast's Vacances Portugaises (Portuguese Vacations), André Cayatte's experimental 'paired' films Jean-Marc ou La vie conjugale (Anatomy of a Marriage: My Days with Jean-Marc), and Françoise ou La vie conjugale (Anatomy of a Marriage: My Days with Françoise), and director Éric Rohmer's La Boulangère de Monceau (The Girl at the Monceau Bakery).

Girardon also worked in television. In 1967, she played Nicole in the first season of Les Chevaliers du ciel. The success of this series brought her a very high level of popularity.

Later years and death
During the 1960s, Girardon became romantically involved with a married Spanish nobleman and occasional actor, José Luis de Vilallonga, whom she had first met on the set of Les Amants. The couple lived together throughout much of the 1960s.

By 1971, Girardon's acting career was over and after finally obtaining his divorce in 1972, de Vilallonga ended their relationship to marry another woman, Ursula Dietrich. Girardon never married or had children and became increasingly despondent. She committed suicide via an overdose of sleeping pills at the age of 36 in Lyon on 25 March 1975. She is interred near Paris in the Cimetière de Bagneux, Hauts de Seine.

Filmography

References

External links

1938 births
1975 suicides
20th-century French actresses
Actresses from Lyon
Burials at the Cimetière parisien de Bagneux
Drug-related suicides in France
French film actresses
French television actresses
Spaghetti Western actresses
Western (genre) film actresses